Thomas Woods "Tom, Tuck" Syme (15 May 1928 – 22 August 2011) was a British ice hockey player. He played for the Dunfermline Vikings and Paisley Pirates during the 1940s and 1950s. He also played for the Great Britain national ice hockey team at the 1948 Winter Olympics and the 1950 Ice Hockey World Championships. After retiring from ice hockey he emigrated to Canada before settling in the United States in 1960. He was inducted to the British Ice Hockey Hall of Fame in 2005.

He was the younger brother of fellow British Ice Hockey Hall of Fame member, James "Tiny" Syme. He died 22 August 2011 of kidney failure.

External links
 
 British Ice Hockey Hall of Fame entry

1928 births
2011 deaths
British Ice Hockey Hall of Fame inductees
Ice hockey players at the 1948 Winter Olympics
Olympic ice hockey players of Great Britain
Paisley Pirates players
People from Blairhall
Scottish emigrants to Canada
Scottish emigrants to the United States
Scottish ice hockey defencemen
Sportspeople from Fife
Deaths from kidney failure